Pojo is a village in the Cochabamba Department in central Bolivia. It is the seat of Pojo Municipality, the second municipal section of Carrasco Province. At the time of census 2001 it had a population of 706.

References

External links
 Map of Carrasco Province

Populated places in Cochabamba Department